"Eruption" is a guitar solo performed by Eddie Van Halen and the second track from Van Halen's self-titled 1978 debut album. It is widely considered one of the greatest guitar solos of all time, having popularized tapping. It segues into a cover of the Kinks' "You Really Got Me", and the two songs are usually played together by radio stations and in concert. The song was later included as the B-side to the group's second single, "Runnin' with the Devil".

Composition and recording

"Eruption" starts with a short accompanied intro with Alex Van Halen on drums and Michael Anthony on bass. The highlight of the solo is the use of two-handed tapping. "Eruption" was played on the Frankenstrat, with an MXR Phase 90, an Echoplex, a Univox echo unit and a 1968 Marshall 1959 Super Lead tube amp. The Sunset Sound studio reverb room was also used to add reverb. The Frankenstrat was tuned down a half-step. "Eruption" begins in the key of A flat and ends on an E flat note that is a twelfth fret, 6th string harmonic processed through a Univox EC-80 echo unit.

Inspiration 
The "Eruption" introduction is based on the "Let Me Swim" introduction by Cactus. After the intro, an E-flat major quotation of the "Etude No. 2" by Rodolphe Kreutzer is heard. The end section begins with a series of rapid two-handed tapping triads that have a classical like structure and eventually finishes with a repeated classical cadence followed by sound effects generated by a Univox EC-80 echo unit.

The piece that would later be named "Eruption" had existed as part of Van Halen's stage act at least as far back as 1975, when it featured no tapping. Although one-handed tapping (hammer-ons and pull-offs) was standard guitar technique, "Eruption" introduced two-handed tapping to the mainstream popular rock audience, and it was a popular soloing option throughout the 1980s.

Initially, "Eruption" was not considered as a track for the Van Halen album as it was just a guitar solo Eddie performed live in the clubs. But Ted Templeman overheard it in the studio as Eddie was rehearsing it for a club date at the Whisky a Go Go and decided to include it on the album. Eddie recalled, "I didn't even play it right. There's a mistake at the top end of it. To this day, whenever I hear it, I always think, 'Man, I could've played it better.'"

"Spanish Fly", an acoustic guitar solo on Van Halen II, can be viewed as a nylon-string version of "Eruption", expanding on similar techniques. Similarly, it was suggested by Templeman for inclusion on the album after he heard Eddie Van Halen playing a classical guitar. In March 2005, Q magazine placed "Eruption" at number 29 in its list of the 100 Greatest Guitar Tracks.  "Eruption" has been named the 2nd greatest guitar solo by Guitar World magazine. Chuck Klosterman of Vulture.com named it the best Van Halen song, noting "if you love Van Halen, this is what you love, and you can listen to it a thousand times without diminishing returns."

Personnel 
Eddie Van Halen – electric guitar
Michael Anthony – bass
Alex Van Halen – drums

Accolades

References

Further reading

External links 
 Eddie Van Halen Guitar Player 1980 Interview

1978 songs
Rock instrumentals
Song recordings produced by Ted Templeman
Songs written by Michael Anthony (musician)
Songs written by David Lee Roth
Songs written by Alex Van Halen
Songs written by Eddie Van Halen
Van Halen songs